"To the Rear of the Enemy", also translated as To Go Behind Enemy Lines, is a Chinese patriotic song written in 1938 by Zhao Qihai. The song was a popular melody during the Second Sino-Japanese War, where it was used by numerous guerilla groups and gained popularity as a resistance song against the Japanese.

History
The song was written by Zhao Qihai and composed by Xing Xinghai in September 1938. During the Second Sino-Japanese War in 1937, Qihai was a student at Beijing Normal University, and, alongside a number of other progressives and students, founded the Peiping Students' Exile Theatre Group to produce anti-Japanese music and propaganda. Similarly, Xinghai was a travelling musician, touring China with communist sympathisers in an attempt to rally support against the Japanese. In early 1938, the two met in Wuhan, and began producing music together.

During this time, Qihai became increasingly influenced by the methodologies of guerilla warfare in the lyrics of his music, in particular the 1938 compilation On Protracted War, which stressed the use of small raids against the Japanese from behind enemy lines. In September 1938, Qihai and Xinghai wrote a series of musical works inspired by these communist guerrilla tactics, of which To the Rear of the Enemy became the most popular. The song was used extensively in Chinese propaganda works both during and after the war, and became a popular revolutionary song.

Lyrics

See also
Maoism
Mao Zedong
The East Is Red (song)
Cultural Revolution
Ode to the Motherland
Sailing the Seas Depends on the Helmsman

References
Mao Tse-tung. "On Protracted War." Selected Works of Mao Tse-tung, Vol. II. Foreign Languages Press: Peking, 1967.
http://culture.people.com.cn/n/2015/0714/c397463-27304056.html
http://www.xinhuanet.com/politics/2015-08/09/c_1116192403.htm
http://money.163.com/15/0821/14/B1I3A5AA00253B0H.html

Historical national anthems
Cultural Revolution
Chinese patriotic songs
Maoist China propaganda songs
Asian anthems
Chinese military marches